Dolph Schluter  (born May 22, 1955) is a Canadian professor of Evolutionary Biology and a Canada Research Chair in the Department of Zoology at the University of British Columbia.  Schluter is a major researcher in adaptive radiation and currently studies speciation in the three-spined stickleback, Gasterosteus aculeatus.

Schluter received his Bachelor of Science from the University of Guelph in 1977, and his Doctor of Philosophy from the University of Michigan in 1983, both in Ecology and Evolution.  Schluter's early research was done on the evolutionary ecology and morphology of Darwin's finches.

Schluter is the author of The Ecology of Adaptive Radiation, 2000, Oxford University Press, and The Analysis of Biological Data, 2009 (and 2015), with Michael Whitlock, and an editor with Robert E. Ricklefs of Species Diversity in Ecological Communities: Historical and Geographical Perspectives, 1993, Chicago University Press.

In 1999, he was elected as a fellow of the Royal Society of London. In 2001, he was elected as a fellow of the Royal Society of Canada. In 2017, he was elected as a Foreign Fellow of the US National Academy of Sciences. Schluter was made a Member of the Order of British Columbia in 2021.  In 2023, Schluter was awarded the Crafoord Prize for "revolutionary studies of finches and sticklebacks [which have] provided us with knowledge of how species arise."

References

External links
 science.ca profile

1955 births
Living people
Fellows of the Royal Society
Fellows of the Royal Society of Canada
Evolutionary biologists
Canada Research Chairs
Academic staff of the University of British Columbia
University of Guelph alumni
University of Michigan alumni
Fellows of the American Academy of Arts and Sciences
Foreign associates of the National Academy of Sciences
Members of the Order of British Columbia